Sapogovo is a rural locality in Pashkovsky Selsoviet Rural Settlement, Kursky District, Kursk Oblast, Russia. Population:

Geography 
The village is located on the Tuskar River (a right tributary of the Seym), 99 km from the Russia–Ukraine border, 2 km north of the district center – the town Kursk, 6.5 km from the selsoviet center – Chaplygina.

 Streets
There are the following streets in the locality: Bereznik, Dorozhnaya, Lesnaya, Novosyolov, Pervomayskaya, Polevaya, Rogozhkina, Sadovaya, Shkolnaya, Tsentralnaya and Vygonnaya (382 houses).

 Climate
Sapogovo has a warm-summer humid continental climate (Dfb in the Köppen climate classification).

Transport 

The rural locality is situated 9.5 km from Kursk Vostochny Airport, 132 km from Belgorod International Airport and 208 km from Voronezh Peter the Great Airport.

References

Notes

Sources

Rural localities in Kursky District, Kursk Oblast